Louis de Pastour de Costebelle (ca. 1658 – unknown) naval officer served as interim governor of Plaisance (Placentia), Newfoundland, before the arrival of Jacques-François de Monbeton de Brouillan in 1690. Costebelle came to Newfoundland as head of a detachment of soldiers in 1687.

Philippe Pastour de Costebelle, a brother of Louis, was the governor of Plaisance from 1706 to 1713.

See also

Governors of Newfoundland
List of people of Newfoundland and Labrador

External links
Biography at Government House The Governorship of Newfoundland and Labrador
 

Governors of Plaisance
1650s births
Year of death missing